Bulbophyllum coniferum is a species of orchid from the genus Bulbophyllum family.

References
The Bulbophyllum-Checklist
The Internet Orchid Species Photo Encyclopedia

coniferum